The long green wrasse, Pseudojuloides elongatus, is a species of wrasse native to coastal waters from Australia to New Zealand and Norfolk Island (records from the Izu Islands, Japan are considered an undescribed species). It can reach  in standard length. This species is also found the aquarium trade.

References

Long green wrasse
Fish described in 1977